Charlie Chaplin's Comic Capers was an American gag-a-day celebrity comics comic strip by Stuart Carothers  and later Elzie C. Segar starring Charlie Chaplin. It ran in syndication from March 29, 1915, until September 16, 1917. It was one of the earliest comic strips inspired by the popularity of a celebrity.

Background

Charlie Chaplin's Comic Capers was published in the Chicago Herald. The comic strip cashed in on the tremendous popularity of the comedian at the time. It was created by Stewart W. Carothers in March 1915, who drew and wrote the stories until his tragic early death from defenestration. Two cartoonists credited as Warren and Ramsey took over the series until they were replaced by Elzie C. Segar, at that time still an amateur. On February 29, 1916, Segar published his first Chaplin strip. The daily version ran until July 15, 1916. His Sunday version ran longer, from March 12, 1916, until September 16, 1917. It was his first professional cartooning job. Contrary to his predecessors, who mostly borrowed ideas from Chaplin's films, Segar thought up his own jokes. He gave Chaplin a tiny sidekick named "Luke the Gook" to act as a  straight man to his gags.

Collections
In 1917, five books were published by M.A. Donohue & Co., in 'Best of' style collections. Four of them being painting/coloring books. These books are considered to be from the Platinum Age.

Published collections;
 Charlie Chaplin's Comic Capers, Series 1, No 315
 Charlie Chaplin in the Movies, No 316
 Charlie Chaplin Up in the Air, No 317
 Charlie Chaplin in the Army, No 318
 Charlie Chaplin's Funny Stunts, in Full Color, No. 380

Reception
Despite Chaplin's popularity, the comic strip wasn't a huge success in the United States, mostly due to the fact that all artists involved were basically amateurs.

See also
 Inside Woody Allen, another newspaper comic strip based on a comedic film performer.
 Charlie Chaplin comics

References

External links
 Charley Chaplin's Comic Capers, A Collection {A 'Internet Archive' digital collection of book scans, and daily comics.}
 "Teary Eyes" Anderson in Charlie Chaplin's Comic Capers: Series 1, No. 315. {Video review and narration of first book.}
 Charlie Chaplin's Comic Capers v1 315 {Scans of first book, hosted by comicbookplus.com.}
 U'Ren, Christine. "Ripped from the Funny Pages, Part 3: Celebrity Cartoonists, Chaplin, and Other Tramps," Silent San Francisco (Oct. 19, 2015).

1915 comics debuts
1917 comics endings
American comic strips
Comics based on films
Comic strips based on real people
Comic strips set in the United States
Cultural depictions of Charlie Chaplin
Defunct American comics
Gag-a-day comics
Public domain comics
Comic strips started in the 1910s